The Cuyahoga River (or  ) is a river located in Northeast Ohio that bisects the City of Cleveland and feeds into Lake Erie.

As Cleveland emerged as a major manufacturing center, the river became heavily affected by industrial pollution, so much so that it caught fire at least 14 times, most famously on June 22, 1969, helping to spur the American environmental movement. Since then, the river has been extensively cleaned up through the efforts of Cleveland's city government and the Ohio Environmental Protection Agency (OEPA). In 2019, the American Rivers conservation association named the Cuyahoga "River of the Year" in honor of "50 years of environmental resurgence".

Etymology 
The name Cuyahoga is believed to mean "crooked river" from the Mohawk name Cayagaga, although the Mohawk were never in the region alongside European settlers, so this explanation is questionable. Some think that it comes from the Seneca word for "jawbone". This explanation, however, is as uncertain as the Mohawk explanation. A close match in the Seneca language is Gayó'ha'geh, meaning "on your chin". The river's crooked form does vaguely resemble an animal's jawbone. It is possible that Europeans once wished to call it that, but the name "Cuyahoga" ended up becoming more prevalent and folk etymology took over, creating an accidental link between the two names that did not actually exist.

Early maps from the era of French control of the region, when the Wyandot were the only tribe there, mark the river as "Cuyahoga", although the Wyandot name for the river is Yažaʔyeh.

Course 

The Cuyahoga watershed begins its  journey in Hambden, Ohio, flowing southward to the confluence of the East Branch Cuyahoga River and West Branch Cuyahoga River in Burton, where the Cuyahoga River officially begins. It continues on its  journey flowing southward to Akron and Cuyahoga Falls, where it turns sharply north and flows through the Cuyahoga Valley National Park in northern Summit County and southern Cuyahoga County. It then flows through Independence, Valley View, Cuyahoga Heights, Newburgh Heights and Cleveland to its northern terminus, emptying into Lake Erie.  The Cuyahoga River and its tributaries drain  of land in portions of six counties.

The river is a relatively recent geologic formation, formed by the advance and retreat of ice sheets during the last ice age. The final glacial retreat, which occurred 10,000–12,000 years ago, caused changes in the drainage pattern near Akron. This change in pattern caused the originally south-flowing Cuyahoga to flow to the north. As its newly reversed currents flowed toward Lake Erie, the river carved its way around glacial debris left by the receding ice sheet, resulting in the river's winding U-shape. These meanderings stretched the length of the river (which was only 30 miles (50 km) when traveled directly) into a 100-mile (160 km) trek from its headwaters to its mouth.

History 
The river was one of the features along which the "Greenville Treaty Line" ran beginning in 1795, per the Treaty of Greenville that ended the Northwest Indian War in the Ohio Country, effectively becoming the western boundary of the United States and remaining so briefly. On July 22, 1796, Moses Cleaveland, a surveyor charged with exploring the Connecticut Western Reserve, arrived at the mouth of the Cuyahoga and subsequently located a settlement there, which became the city of Cleveland.

Environmental cleanup 

The Cuyahoga River, at times during the 20th century, was one of the most polluted rivers in the United States. The reach from Akron to Cleveland was devoid of fish. A 1968 Kent State University symposium described one section of the river:

At least 13 fires have been reported on the Cuyahoga River, the first occurring in 1868. The largest river fire, in 1952, caused over $1 million in damage to boats, a bridge, and a riverfront office building.

Things began to change in the late 1960s, when new mayor Carl Stokes and his utilities director rallied voters to approve a $100 million bond to rehabilitate Cleveland's rivers. Then, the mayor seized the opportunity of a June 22, 1969 river fire triggered by a spark from a passing rail car igniting an oil slick to bring reporters to the river to raise attention to the issue. The 1969 fire caused approximately $50,000 in damage, mostly to an adjacent railroad bridge, but despite Mayor Stokes' efforts, very little attention was initially given to the incident, and it was not considered a major news story in the Cleveland media.

However, the incident did soon garner the attention of Time magazine, which used a dramatic photo of the even larger 1952 blaze in an article on the pollution of America's waterways. The article described the Cuyahoga as the river that "oozes rather than flows" and in which a person "does not drown but decays" and listed other badly-polluted rivers across the nation. (No pictures of the 1969 fire are known to exist, as local media did not arrive on the scene until after the fire was under control). The article launched Time's new "Environment" section, and gained wide readership not only on its own merit, but because the same issue featured coverage of astronauts Neil Armstrong and Buzz Aldrin landing on the moon the previous week in the Apollo 11 mission, and had Senator Ted Kennedy on the cover for a story on the Chappaquiddick incident in which Kennedy's automobile passenger, Mary Jo Kopechne, had drowned.

The 1969 Cuyahoga River fire helped spur an avalanche of water pollution control activities, resulting in amendments extending the Clean Water Act, Great Lakes Water Quality Agreement, and the creation of the federal Environmental Protection Agency (EPA) and the Ohio Environmental Protection Agency (OEPA). Mayor Stokes gave Congressional testimony on his and other major big cities' struggles with polluting industries to restore the environmental health of their communities. As a result, large point sources of pollution on the Cuyahoga have received significant attention from the OEPA in subsequent decades. These events are referred to in Randy Newman's 1972 song "Burn On", R.E.M.'s 1986 song "Cuyahoga", and Adam Again's 1992 song "River on Fire". Great Lakes Brewing Company of Cleveland named its Burning River Pale Ale after the event.

In December 1970 a federal grand jury investigation led by U.S. Attorney Robert Jones began, of water pollution allegedly being caused by about 12 companies in northeastern Ohio; it was the first grand jury investigation of water pollution in the area. The Attorney General of the United States, John N. Mitchell, gave a Press Conference December 18, 1970 referencing new pollution control litigation, with particular reference to work with the new Environmental Protection Agency, and announcing the filing of a law suit that morning against the Jones and Laughlin Steel Corporation for discharging substantial quantities of cyanide into the Cuyahoga River near Cleveland. Jones filed the misdemeanor charges in District Court, alleging violations of the 1899 Rivers and Harbors Act. There were multiple other suits filed by Jones.

Water quality has improved and, partially in recognition of this improvement, the Cuyahoga was designated one of 14 American Heritage Rivers in 1998. Despite these efforts, pollution continues to exist in the Cuyahoga River due to other sources of pollution, including urban runoff, nonpoint source problems, combined sewer overflows, and stagnation due to water impounded by dams. For this reason, the Environmental Protection Agency classified portions of the Cuyahoga River watershed as one of 43 Great Lakes Areas of Concern. The most polluted portions of the river now generally meet established aquatic life water quality standards except near dam impoundments. The reasons for not meeting standards near the dam pools are habitat and fish passage issues rather than water quality. River reaches that were once devoid of fish now support 44 species. The most recent survey in 2008 revealed the two most common species in the river were hogsuckers and spotfin shiners, both moderately sensitive to water quality. Habitat issues within the  navigation channel still preclude a robust fishery in that reach. Recreation water quality standards (using bacteria as indicators) are generally met during dry weather conditions, but are often exceeded during significant rains due to nonpoint sources and combined sewer overflows. In March 2019 the OEPA declared fish caught in the river safe to eat.

Modifications 

The lower Cuyahoga River, just west of present-day downtown Cleveland, has been subjected to numerous changes. The current mouth is man-made, created in 1827, and allows shipping traffic to flow freely between the river and the lake. The Corps of Engineers has also straightened river banks and widened turning basins in the federal navigation channel on the lower Cuyahoga River to facilitate maritime operations.

Ice-breaking 
The United States Coast Guard sometimes conducts fall and spring ice-breaking operations along Lake Erie and the lower Cuyahoga River to prolong the Great Lakes shipping season, depending on shipping schedules and weather conditions.

Flooding 
Some attempts (including dams and dredging) have been made to control flooding along the Cuyahoga River basin. As a result of speculative land development, buildings have been erected on many flat areas that are only a few feet above normal river levels.  Sudden strong rain or snow storms can create severe flooding in these low-lying areas.

Some tributary elevations above are higher than the Cuyahoga River elevation, because of small waterfalls at or near their confluences; and distances are measured in "river miles" along the river's length from its mouth on Lake Erie.

Accidents 
On August 25, 2020, a Holland Oil and Gas fuel tanker crashed on Route 8 near Akron and Cuyahoga Falls, killing one individual and causing a fire that leaked fuel into the southern section of the river. The fire was extinguished by the Akron Fire Department and the river section and surrounding area were promptly cleaned up. The fatal road crash marked the first and only river fire incident on the Cuyahoga since June 1969. However, as scholar Anne Jefferson notes:

Dams

Former Ohio and Erie Canal diversion dam 
The Brecksville Dam at river mile 20 was the first dam upstream of Lake Erie. It affected fish populations by restricting their passage. The dam was removed in 2020.

Gorge Metropolitan Park Dam 

The largest dam is the Gorge Metropolitan Park Dam, also known as the FirstEnergy Dam, on the border between Cuyahoga Falls and Akron. This  dam has for over 90 years submerged the falls for which the City of Cuyahoga Falls was named; more to the point of water quality, it has created a large stagnant pool with low dissolved oxygen.

On April 9, 2019, officials from the U.S. EPA and Ohio EPA announced a plan to remove the Gorge Metropolitan Park Dam by 2023 at a cost of $65 to $70 million. Funding for the project was authorized through the Great Lakes Legacy Act with funds coming from the City of Akron and members of the Gorge Dam Stakeholder Committee, including Summit Metro Parks, FirstEnergy, and the City of Cuyahoga Falls.  the planned date of removal is 2026.

The FirstEnergy Dam was built by the Northern Ohio Traction and Light Co. in 1912 to serve the dual functions of generating hydropower for its local streetcar system and providing cooling-water storage for a coal-burning power plant; however, the hydropower operation was discontinued in 1958, and the coal-burning plant was decommissioned in 1991. Some environmental groups and recreational groups want the dam removed. Others contend that such an effort would be expensive and complicated, for at least two reasons: first, the formerly hollow dam was filled in with concrete in the early 1990s, and second, because of the industrial history of Cuyahoga Falls, the sediment upstream of the dam is expected to contain hazardous chemicals, possibly including heavy metals and PCBs. The Ohio EPA estimated removal of the dam would cost $5–10 million, and removal of the contaminated sediments, a further $60 million. The dam is licensed through 2041.

Dams in Cuyahoga Falls 
In late 2012, two dams in Cuyahoga Falls, the Sheraton and LeFever Dams, were scheduled for demolition, as the result of an agreement between the City of Cuyahoga Falls, which owns the dams, and the Northeast Ohio Regional Sewer District, which will provide $1 million of funding to remove the dams. On December 12, 2012, the ACOE issued a permit, allowing the demolition to proceed. As part of the project, a water trail was developed. In early June 2013, dam removal began, and ended in August 20, 2013. This brought about a mile of the river back to its natural state, removed  of structures, and exposed an equivalent quantity of whitewater for recreation.  In 2019, attempts by the city to address increased erosion as a result of the removal of these and other area dams were publicized.

Munroe Falls Dam 
Two other dams, in Kent and in Munroe Falls, though smaller, have had an even greater impact on water quality due to the lower gradient in their respective reaches. For this reason, the Ohio EPA required the communities to mitigate the effects of the dams.

The Munroe Falls Dam was modified in 2005. Work on this project uncovered a natural waterfall. Given this new knowledge about the riverbed, some interested parties, including Summit County, campaigned for complete removal of the dam. The revised plan, initially denied on September 20, 2005, was approved by the Munroe Falls City Council on a week later. The  sandstone dam has since been removed, and in its place now is a natural ledge with a  drop at its greatest point.

Kent Dam 
The Kent Dam was bypassed in 2004 and was the first dam modification project in the state of Ohio that was made solely for water quality issues. The modification resulted in the river fully attaining the designated Ohio water quality standards.

Lists

Variant names 
According to the United States Geological Survey Geographic Names Information System, the Cuyahoga River has also been known as:

 Cajahage River
 Cayagaga River
 Cayahoga River
 Cayhahoga River
 Cayohoga River
 Cujahaga River
 Cuyohaga River
 Gichawaga Creek
 Goyahague River
 Gwahago River
 River de Saguin
 Rivière Blanche
 Rivière à Seguin
 Saguin River
 Yashahia
 Cayahaga River
 Cayanhoga River
 Cayhoga River
 Coyahoga River
 Cuahoga River
 Guyahoga River
 Gwahoga River
 Kiahagoh River
 White River

Dams

Tributaries 
Generally, rivers are larger than creeks, which are larger than brooks, which are larger than runs.
Runs may be dry except during or after a rain, at which point they can flash flood and be torrential.

Default is standard order from mouth to upstream:

See also 
List of crossings of the Cuyahoga River
List of rivers of Ohio

Notes

References

General references 

 
 
 
 
 Akron Beacon Journal Editorial (2005). All Wet. Retrieved July 29, 2005.
 AP / Cleveland Plain Dealer. Dam removal to return Cuyahoga to natural, free-flowing state. Posted September 29, 2005; retrieved October 6, 2005.

External links 

 Cuyahoga River Community Planning Organization
 Cuyahoga Valley
 Friends of the Crooked River
 National Whitewater River Inventory
 Lower Cuyahoga Gorge (below the Ohio Edison Dam)
 Upper Cuyahoga Gorge (Cuyahoga Falls, above the Dam)
 Kent to Munroe Falls
 Ira Rd. to Peninsula
 Peninsula to Boston Mills
 Cuyahoga River and Cuyahoga River Fire entries from the Encyclopedia of Cleveland History
 Year of the River, The Plain Dealer special section commemorating the 40th anniversary of the 1969 fire

 
Rivers of Ohio
Waste disposal incidents in the United States
Water pollution in the United States
Rivers of Cuyahoga County, Ohio
Rivers of Geauga County, Ohio
Rivers of Portage County, Ohio
Rivers of Summit County, Ohio
Cuyahoga Valley National Park
Tributaries of Lake Erie
American Heritage Rivers